Bernard Victor Jacob  (20 November  1921 – 7 December 1992) was an  Archdeacon in the Anglican Diocese of Southwark from  1977 to 1988.

Jacob was educated at the Liverpool Institute and St Peter's College, Oxford. After a curacy at Middleton he was Vicar of Ulverston then Bilston. From 1964 to 1968 he was Warden of Scargill House then Rector of Mortlake. In 1977 he was appointed Archdeacon of Kingston-upon-Thames; and in 1986 of Reigate.

References

1921 births
People educated at Liverpool Institute High School for Boys
Alumni of St Peter's College, Oxford
Archdeacons of Kingston upon Thames
Archdeacons of Reigate
1992 deaths